A fake blog (sometimes shortened to flog or referred to as a flack blog) is an electronic communication in the blog format that appears to originate from a credible, non-biased and independent source, but which in fact is created by a company or organization for the purpose of marketing a product, service, or political viewpoint. The purpose of a fake blog is to inspire viral marketing or create an internet meme that generates traffic and interest in a product, much the same as astroturfing (a "fake grassroots" campaign).

A fake blog is akin to industry-supported "astroturf" efforts that pose as legitimate grassroots activity. Fake blogs are corrupted forms of public relations, which as a discipline demands transparency and honesty, according to the Public Relations Society of America's code of ethics and the Word of Mouth Marketing Association's code of ethics. Authenticity and transparency are important in social networking and blogging, as these codes of ethics attest. The UK Chartered Institute of Public Relations' social media guidelines cite the Consumer Protection from Unfair Trading Regulations 2008 and state that both astroturfing and fake blogs are not permitted.

As social networking tools gain in popularity, corporations and special-interest groups legitimately use their own blogs to promote company agendas without cloaking their identities (one such example is Southwest Airlines Blog, a blog sponsored by Southwest Airlines and written by its employees).

One notorious example of identity cloaking, resulting in a fake blog, was exposed when Edelman, an international public relations firm, created a fake blog in 2006 called Walmarting Across America. It was purportedly written by two Wal-Mart "enthusiasts" who decided to journey across the United States in an RV, blogging about the experience as they visited Wal-Marts along the way. While two people actually did travel across the United States in an RV, the publicity stunt was revealed to be paid for by Wal-Mart, a client of Edelman.

The act of writing fake blogs, or the commercial, strategy behind it, has been referred to as "flogging",

Fake parody blogs
One genre of fake blogs is the parody blog; written ostensibly by a celebrity or other noteworthy individual. Unlike other flogs, parody blogs are not necessarily marketing tools. Parody blogs are often written to entertain, confuse, enlighten or to express a point of view through satire and humor. Noteworthy parody blogs include Fake Steve Jobs, Mock Mark Cuban and the network News Groper. There are also a very popular regional flogs like the one of the Indian Prime Minister and the a famous stock market speculator called Jhunjhunwala

Notable flogs

4Railroads & Mcdmillionwinner, blogs promoting McDonald's Monopoly. Allegedly created by "Stanley Smith" and Marcia Schroeder (a real winner in 2004, but who had nothing to do with writing the blog). Both were pulled shortly after being exposed.
Wal-Marting Across America, written by two Walmart "enthusiasts" who decided to journey across America in an RV and blog about the experience as they visited Walmarts along the way. While the two people actually did travel across America for the purpose of this blog, it was revealed to be paid for by Walmart.
All I want for Xmas is a PSP, purported to be written by a group of kids who wanted to get a friend's parents to buy him a PlayStation Portable. Exposed due to the domain registration, as well as a post admitting the blog was fake shortly before the site and all of its contents were pulled down.
 Working Families for Wal-Mart, Working Families for Wal-Mart for Wal-Mart by Edelman
 Paid Critics for Wal-Mart by Edelman
 Dr. John H. Watson for Sherlock BBC TV series.

References

Blogs
Online advertising
Blog
Ethically disputed business practices

sv:Flog